Chaetolixophaga is a genus of tachinid flies in the family Tachinidae.

Species
Chaetolixophaga laspeyresiae Blanchard, 1940

Distribution
Argentina.

References

Exoristinae
Taxa named by Émile Blanchard
Tachinidae genera
Diptera of South America